Yanubbee Creek is a stream in McCurtain County of the U.S. state of Oklahoma.

The stream headwaters are the confluence of the East and West Forks at  adjacent to US Route 259 north of Broken Bow and it flows to the south-southeast past Broken Bow and under US Route 70.

Yanubbee is a name derived from the Choctaw language meaning "ironwood". A variant spelling is "Yanubbe Creek".

References

Rivers of Oklahoma
Rivers of McCurtain County, Oklahoma